Blepephaeus annulatus is a species of beetle in the family Cerambycidae. It was described by Stephan von Breuning in 1936. It is known from Vietnam.

References

Blepephaeus
Beetles described in 1936